Fath Bagh (also Romanized as Fatḩ Bāgh; also known as Patbāgh) is a village in Anjirabad Rural District, in the Central District of Gorgan County, Golestan Province, Iran. At the 2006 census, its population was 121, in 31 families.

References 

Populated places in Gorgan County